Jatropha elliptica is a species of flowering plant, a shrub in the family Euphorbiaceae.

The species is native to Bolivia, Brazil, and Paraguay.

It is used in folk medicine to treat itches, snake bites, syphilis, ulcer, urinary discharge, neoplasia, and abdominal issues. Studies on the species have shown it has chemical and medicinal properties. Like one study stated this species has antibothropic and anti-inflammatory properties.

References

Flora of Bolivia
Flora of Brazil
Flora of Paraguay
elliptica